Alàs is a village in the municipality of Alàs i Cerc in the comarca of Alt Urgell, Lleida, Catalonia, Spain.

References

Populated places in Alt Urgell